The Czech Republic national handball team is the national handball team of the Czech Republic. It was most successful in the mid-1990s, with sixth place at the 1996 European Championship and a win over the later runners-up Croatia at the 1995 World Championship, but the team have failed to qualify for major championships on several occasions since.

Before the Czech Republic became independent in 1993, the Czechoslovakia national team won five World Championship medals between 1954 and 1967, and qualified for every World Championship between 1954 and 1993. However, the Czech federation were admitted in time to attempt to qualify for the first European Championship in 1994. They were eliminated by another new nation, Slovenia, after losing on the away goals rule.

Results

World Championship

European Championship

Team

Current squad
Squad for the 2020 European Men's Handball Championship.

Head coach: Jan Filip

Notable former players
Jan Filip
Martin Galia
Filip Jícha
David Juříček
Daniel Kubeš
Karel Nocar
Petr Štochl

Player statistics

Most capped players

Topscorers

References

External links

IHF profile

Men's national handball teams
Handball in the Czech Republic
Handball